The Kaweah Gap is the lowest east–west pass through the Great Western Divide, in Sequoia National Park, California, United States. The High Sierra Trail is routed through this pass.

The Kaweah Gap is flanked by Mount Stewart to the north and Eagle Scout Peak to the south.

References 

Sequoia National Park